Dysgonia conjunctura is a moth of the family Noctuidae first described by Francis Walker in 1858. It is found in Africa, including Príncipe, South Africa, Gabon and Kenya.

References

Dysgonia
Moths of Africa
Insects of West Africa
Insects of Uganda
Fauna of Gabon